Vesu is a suburban area located in South West Zone, of Surat. Vesu is the newest area to develop in terms of public transport infrastructure, residential complexes, business parks and shopping arcades.

About
Vesu Is 15 km from Surat Railway station and 5 km from Surat Airport.

See also 
Bhimrad
List of tourist attractions in Surat

References 

Suburban area of Surat
Neighbourhoods in Surat